The Ångström distribution is a defunct Linux distribution for a variety of embedded devices. The distribution is the result of work by developers from the OpenZaurus, OpenEmbedded, and OpenSIMpad projects.  The graphical user interfaces (GUIs) available are OPIE and GPE among other options.

The Ångström distribution is in "competition" with Poky Linux.  Ångström is based on the  OpenEmbedded project, specifically the  OpenEmbedded-Core (OE-Core) layer.  While both Ångström and Poky Linux are based on OE-Core, mostly utilize the same toolchain and are both officially "Yocto compatible", only Poky Linux is officially part of the Yocto Project.

Ångström primarily differs from Poky Linux in being a binary distribution (like e.g. the Debian, Fedora, OpenSuse or Ubuntu Linux distributions), using opkg for package management.  Hence an essential part of Ångström builds is a binary package feed, allowing to simply install software distributed as opkg packages, without having to compile them first (just as one might install a binary package with  aptitude or dpkg).

Target platforms 
According to the Ångström wiki, Ångström is being developed for at least the following devices:
 Sharp Zaurus:
 SL-5500 (Collie)
 SL-5600 (Poodle)
 SL-6000 (Tosa)
 SL-C7x0 (Corgi, Husky, Shepherd)
 SL-C860 (Boxer)
 SL-C1000 (Akita)
 SL-C3xxx (Spitz, Borzoi, Terrier)
 Hewlett Packard iPAQ PDA
 h2200
 h4000
 hx4700
 h5000
 Nokia 770 Internet Tablet
 HTC Universal/iMate JasJar
 Motorola A780
 Psion Teklogix NetBook Pro
 Gumstix and Kouchuk-Bars
 Hawkboard
 BeagleBoard
 BeagleBone and BeagleBone Black
 PandaBoard
 OpenPandora
 OMAPEVM
 Base for Openmoko distribution
 Archos:
 Archos 5
 Archos 7
 Archos 5 Internet Tablet
 Archos 101
 Archos 32
 Archos 28
 Minnowboard
 Polyvision Roomwizard
 piA-AM335x
 96Boards
 Chameleon96

See also 

 Familiar Linux
 Openmoko
 OpenPandora
 OpenZaurus
 WebOS
 Pocket PC
 Windows Mobile

References

External links 
 
 Ångström Manual

ARM Linux distributions
Debian-based distributions
Embedded Linux distributions
Operating systems using GPE Palmtop Environment
Personal digital assistant software
Linux distributions